Gordon William "Gordie" Nelson (born  May 10, 1947) is a Canadian retired professional ice hockey player who played three games in the National Hockey League for the Toronto Maple Leafs during the 1969–70 season.

Career statistics

Regular season and playoffs

External links
 

1947 births
Living people
Canadian ice hockey defencemen
Ice hockey people from Saskatchewan
Melville Millionaires players
Phoenix Roadrunners (WHL) players
Portland Buckaroos players
Toronto Maple Leafs players
Tulsa Oilers (1964–1984) players